The Government College University, Lahore (colloquially known as GCU), is a public research university located in Lahore, Punjab, Pakistan. Opened as Government College, Lahore, in 1864, it became a university in 2002.

Overview 
In 1864, Government College was established by the British government in India. After being elevated to university status in 2002, it has advanced into one of the top ten largest institution in Pakistan, with a student body of over 12,000. It has 32 academic departments, segregated into five faculties. There are five research centers, focused on academic and industrial research and development projects. The university secured its second place in the general category by the Higher Education Commission (HEC) in 2013. It has the highest graduation rate in the country, with an average of 94.6% annually. In Government College University, the medium of instruction is English.

Government College University is noted for its historical roots and produced notable scholars such as poet-philosopher Allama Muhammad Iqbal, Nobel laureates Har Gobind Khorana and Abdus Salam, former president of both the United Nations General Assembly and the International Court of Justice Muhammad Zafarullah Khan, scholar and novelist couple Bano Qudsia and Ashfaq Ahmed. Among its graduates are also four prime ministers and one caretaker prime minister of Pakistan.

History 

Originally, the establishment of a central college in Lahore was sanctioned in 1856 by the British Raj, given that the teachers are from University of Oxford, University of Cambridge, Dublin University HC or Durham University. Under the leadership of Dr. Gottlieb Wilhelm Leitner, a professor of Arabic and Islamic Law at King's College London, the college was established on 1 January 1864, located in the Palace of Raja Dhyan Singh Haveli (Dogra prime minister of Sikh ruler Maharaja Ranjit Singh of Lahore) inside Walled City of Lahore, as an affiliated college of Calcutta University.

In April 1871, the college moved to a large Bungalow near Anarkali Bazaar. In 1873, its location was again changed to another house called Rahim Khan's Kothi due to rapidly increasing student strength. It moved to its present building in 1876.

The first principal was Dr. Gottlieb Wilhelm Leitner, whose name is closely attached to the college. In 1882, Leitner was very instrumental in laying the foundation of Punjab University, Lahore. Thereafter, the college would remain affiliated with Punjab University for 115 years. In 1997, government of the Punjab gave Government College autonomy in all affairs and granted degree awarding status.

In 2002, it was promoted to university status by the government of Punjab; the word college was retained in its title for preserving its historical roots.

Campus

Old Campus 
Positioned in Downtown Lahore, it is located at the junction of The Mall, Lahore and the Lower Mall, surrounded by main business and administrative areas, schools, colleges and Punjab University old Campus. The main building was designed by W. Purdon and completed in 1877 at a cost of Rs. 320,000. In the centre of the main building stands a 176' tall clock tower. Being built during the colonial era, the main building reflects the neo-Gothic tradition, with broad verandahs and elevated ceilings. A large ground accompanies the main building, alluded to as the "Oval Ground". In 2019, the ground was renamed "The Leitner Oval", in honour of Gottlieb Wilhelm Leitner, the first principal of the institute. To meet with an increasing number of students, several buildings and blocks have been commissioned which include a postgraduate block, a new block for intermediate students and a bachelors' block which is accessible by the overhead bridge. The main campus is spread over 56 acres along the Anarkali Bazaar, one of the oldest surviving markets in Lahore.

Kala Shah Kaku Campus 
On 24 August 2019, the Kala Shah Kaku campus of the university was inaugurated which is known as GCU KSK campus. The campus is spread over 370 acres, able to house 25,000 students, 1250 teachers and 650 staff members. 22 hostels are available for accommodation.

On 24 September 2020, the new campus was formally opened to students. A bus shuttle service will operate between both campuses.

Emblem 
The torch, as the crest of the university emblem, represents the light of knowledge. The motto "Courage to Know" represents the guiding principle of the student community.

Academics

Programs 
The university offers degrees in Higher Secondary School Certificate (locally referred to as Intermediate), undergraduate and post-graduate studies. In the higher education level, it offers 28 bachelor's degrees, 28 MS/MPhil Degrees and 19 PhD degrees. These degrees are offered under the following faculties:

 Faculty of Chemistry and Life Sciences
 Faculty of Mathematical & Physical Sciences
 Faculty of Arts & Social Sciences
 Faculty of Language, Islamic & Oriental Learning
 Faculty of Engineering

Research 
The university has always been a research-led university, however, in recent times, it has shifted its focus towards quality output projects, which the university believes to be beneficial academically and industrially. Office of Research, Innovation and Commercialization (ORIC) has been set up to manage all research issues. The objective of the office is to advance, diversify and manage all research programs and to uphold international standards of research.

It receives research grants mostly from the foreign universities like Strathclyde University, Cranfield University, World Bank Researchers Alliance for Development and British Council and from national institutes and organizations like Pakistan Atomic Energy Commission (PAEC), Pakistan Science Foundation (PSF), Khan Research Laboratories (KRL), PTCL, Higher Education Commission and Ministry of Science and Technology.

Institutes 
The university has five autonomous/semi-autonomous, research-oriented institutes, focused on academic and industrial research and development projects. These institutes are:

 Abdus Salam School of Mathematical Sciences (ASSMS) – study of scientific and technological problems by mathematical methods in mathematical sciences.
 Center for Advanced Studies in Physics (CASP) – research and development (R&D) in Experimental Physics.
 Institute of Industrial Biotechnology (IIB) – offers degrees in Biotechnology and Microbiology.
 Sustainable Development Study Center (SDSC) – R&D in Environmental science.
 Center of Excellence of China Studies (CECS) – offers diplomas in Chinese language and China studies.

Abdus Salam School for Mathematical Sciences 

The Abdus Salam School of Mathematical Sciences (ASSMS) is one of the largest mathematical research institutes in Pakistan. The school was established in 2003 by Government of the Punjab under the aegis of Government College University. The aim of the school is to train professional scientists to pursue the study of scientific and technological problems by mathematical methods and to undertake research in branches of mathematical sciences. Before the existence of the school, Pakistani mathematicians opted to study abroad for postdoctoral fellowships; but after ASSMS was established, an increasing number of PhD holders from foreign institutions are choosing this school to pursue their postdoctoral fellowships.

In 2011, it was labeled as the first "Emerging Regional Center of Excellence" by the European Mathematical Society (EMS) for the period 2011 to 2015.

It has taken steps to provide encouragement to Pakistani students in schools and colleges. These include:
 Hiring Foreign Faculty to teach or supervise ASSMS students in advanced level mathematics. This step was initiated by the founding Director General of ASSMS, A.D.R. Choudary. Jürgen Herzog, Josip Pečarić, Amer Iqbal, Alexandru Dimca, and Hannah Markwig are among Foreign Faculty that have supervised/co-supervised Ph.D. students at ASSMS.
 Hosted international conferences and workshops in mathematics. The most important conferences of AS-SMS were “World Conferences of Mathematics in the 21st Century” series, held during the tenure of A.D.R. Choudary. Some notable mathematicians that have visited and given talks in this conference series are Ari Laptev (president of the EMS 2007–2010), Marta Sanz-Solé (president of the EMS 2011–2014), Pierre Cartier (an associate of the Bourbaki Group), Arnfinn Laudal, Michel Waldschmidt, János Pach, Alan Huckleberry, Aline Bonami, and Ragni Piene (Chair of the Abel Prize Committee 2010-2014 and the first-ever woman in the International Mathematics Union Executive Committee).
Up until 2014, during the tenure of A.D.R. Choudary, the faculty at the Abdus Salam School of Mathematical Sciences hosted training camps for students from schools and colleges. The participants of the camps are prepared for the national team of Pakistan to compete at the International Mathematical Olympiad (IMO). In 2005, the national team of Pakistan took part for the first time in IMO. Trained in ASSMS, the Pakistan team won its first medal at IMO in 2007 and its first silver medal in 2012.
ASSMS initiated the Mathematical Kangaroo contests at the national level.

Chairs

Abdus Salam Chair in Physics 

The Abdus Salam Chair in Physics, named after the Pakistani theoretical physicist and Nobel laureate Abdus Salam is an honorary chair in physics at the university. Starting out as a semi-autonomous institute, it became operational in March 2000 with the efforts of Ishfaq Ahmad, a lifelong friend of Salam. In 2009, the International Center for Theoretical Physics (ICTP) donated Salam's original Nobel certificate to the Salam Chair in Physics. The former director of ICTP Dr. Katepalli R. Sreenivasan visited Lahore where he gifted the original Nobel certificate to the university's alma mater. The certificate reads: "for their contributions to the theory of the unified weak and electromagnetic interaction between elementary particles, including, inter-alia, the prediction of the weak neutral current".

It has been integrated into Department of Physics, where MPhil and PhD students carry out their research work. Some of its achievements include: getting 52 research publications in international journals; producing 6 PhD and 25 MPhil theses; the setting up of a Plasma Technology Lab; and contracting research grants from funding agencies and research centers such as the International Center for Theoretical Physics (ICTP), Pakistan Atomic Energy Commission (PAEC), Kahuta Research Laboratories (KRL), Pakistan Science Foundation (PSF) and Pakistan Council of Scientific and Industrial Research (PCSIR).

Dr. Rafi Muhammad Chaudhry Chair in Experimental Physics 
The Rafi Muhammad Chaudhry Chair in Experimental Physics was named after Rafi Muhammad Chaudhry, a renowned Pakistani nuclear physicist and a professor of particle physics at the university. He is widely regarded as having been the pioneer of experimental nuclear physics research in Pakistan. During his tenure as a professor at the university, he set up High Tension Laboratory there in 1952 (now amalgamated into Center for Advanced Studies in Physics CASP) where research anent to gaseous discharges, ion, and electron impact phenomena, nuclear physics, radioactivity, and cosmic rays is carried out.

The university set up the chair in recognition of his services to Pakistan and to Physics. Currently, post-graduate research work in Applied Physics is carried out here.

Mahboob-ul-Haq Chair in Economics 
The Mahboob-ul-Haq Chair in Economics is the latest addition to honorary chairs at the university, named after Mahbub ul Haq, a Pakistani economist, politician and international development theorist who served as the 13th Finance Minister of Pakistan. While serving as the Special Advisor to the United Nations Development Program (UNDP), he led the establishment of the Human Development Report (HDI) and the widely respected Human Development Index (HDI). The Economist called him "one of the visionaries of international development."

The university established the chair to recognize his services to Pakistan, its people, and above all to the discipline of Economics. Apart from post-graduate research in Economics, the chair is also in charge of publishing GCU Economics Journal an annual scholarly and peer-audited publication. Its intent is to act as a platform for researchers, professionals, and students to share their achievements, perspectives, and practical experiences.

Other Chairs
The following chairs have been announced and will be put into effect in near future.
 Dr. Muhammad Ajmal Chair in Psychology
 Patras Bokhari Chair in English
 Dr. Har Gobind Khorana Chair in Chemistry

The following six chairs have been established at the respective departments:
 Allama Iqbal Chair in Philosophy
 Gottlieb Wilhelm Leitner Chair in History
 Syed Ali Hujwiri Chair in Persian
 Ashfaq Ahmed Chair in Urdu
 Sultan Ahmed Chair in Biological Sciences

Accommodation 
The university has four hostels – three for boys and one for girls. Iqbal Hostel (built-in 1891) and Quaid-e-Azam Hostel (built-in 1993) accommodate about 150 and 200 Intermediate students, respectively. The New Hostel (built-in 1937) houses about 400 Degree students. Girls Hostel (built-in 1975) accommodates about 50 girl students. A Faculty Mess has been built for visiting family members, faculty and officers of the other universities. Lodging and messing facilities are available here.

Notable alumni 
Alumni of the institute are called Ravians, which is a derived word from the name of the student magazine "Ravi", published by the administration of the college; the magazine name itself is inspired by the Ravi River that passes through Lahore. 
Nawaz Sharif – former three times (12th, 14th, and 20th) prime minister of Pakistan.
Zafarullah Khan Jamali – 15th prime minister of Pakistan.
Yousaf Raza Gillani – 18th prime minister of Pakistan.
Shehbaz Sharif - 23rd prime minister of Pakistan.
Moeenuddin Ahmad Qureshi – former caretaker prime minister of Pakistan and former senior vice president of the World Bank.  
Madan Lal Dhingra (1883–1909), Indian revolutionary, pro-independence activist, who, while studying in England, assassinated a British colonial officer William Hutt Curzon Wyllie, Dhingra was hanged at HM Prison Pentonville, denied Hindu rites and buried by the British authorities. Winston Churchill privately acknowledged Dhingra's statement "[t]he Finest ever made in the name of Patriotism".
Syed Ahmed Shah Patras Bokhari – served as the first Permanent Representative of Pakistan to the United Nations.
Faiz Ahmad Faiz – one of the most celebrated poets of the Urdu language in Pakistan as well as in India.
Dev Anand (born Dharamdev Pishorimal Anand; 26 September 1923 – 3 December 2011), Indian film Superstar, writer, director and producer known for his work in Hindi cinema, through a career that spanned over six decades. He was one of the most successful and celebrated actors in the Indian film history.
Ashfaq Ahmed – Pakistani intellectual, playwright, and broadcaster, awarded the President's Pride of Performance and Sitara-i-Imtiaz for his services in the field of literature.
Bilal U. Haq – marine geoscientist and poet, France's Prestwich Prize laureate in geology. 
Senior Justice Javed Iqbal – son of Dr Muhammad Iqbal; had a prolific career in the Judiciary of Pakistan
Amjad Siddique – Pakistani former first-class cricketer who played for Water and Power Development Authority cricket team (WAPDA cricket team), including some time as captain
Rameez Raja – Pakistani former cricketer, who represented Pakistan in 1990s. He is a well-known commentator in international cricket matches. Now the chairman of the PCB
Raheel Sharif – former Chief of Army Staff of Pakistan.
Iqrar Ul Hassan – TV presenter and Investigative reporter of ARY News. He hosts a famous program "Sar-e-Aam".
Ismat Beg (PhD, Bucharest) – mathematician, known for his work on Multiple-criteria decision analysis and fixed point (mathematics)
Hadiqa Kiani – Pakistani singer.
Aftab Iqbal – senior TV anchor and Journalist
Tariq Jamil – Pakistani Islamic television preacher, religious writer, scholar, and a member of the Tablighi Jamaat.
Javed Ahmad Ghamidi – Pakistani Muslim theologian, Quran scholar, Islamic modernist, exegete and educationist.
Hamid Gul – former Director-General of the Inter-Services Intelligence (ISI), Pakistan's premier intelligence agency, between 1987 and 1989.
Asif Saeed Khan Khosa – Pakistani jurist who served as the 26th chief justice of Pakistan from 18 January 2019 to 20 December 2019.
Jahangir Khan – 6-time squash world champion, who is widely regarded as the greatest squash player of all time. 
Rehan Butt – former international field hockey player and captain of Pakistan team who represented Pakistan from 2002 to 2012
Farid Ahmad Khan - Pakistani doctor and plastic surgeon who served as chairman and dean of Shaikh Zayed Medical Complex from 2015 to 2018, and Registrar of King Edward Medical University from 2011 to 2015.

Gallery

See also

List of Ravians

References

External links 
 
 

Public universities in Punjab, Pakistan
 
Public universities and colleges in Punjab, Pakistan
Academic institutions in Pakistan
Educational institutions established in 1864
1864 establishments in British India
British colonial architecture in India
The Mall, Lahore
Universities and colleges in Lahore
Engineering universities and colleges in Pakistan